Digswell Arts Trust was the brainchild of Henry Morris, a pioneering educationalist. Through his enthusiasm, dedication and influence he persuaded the Government and the Welwyn Garden City Development Corporation to establish a Trust for professional artists in Welwyn Garden City, England.

It was formally inaugurated by Countess Mountbatten on 29 May 1957.

Early years

Digswell House, a decayed Regency mansion with cottages and outbuildings on the edge of Welwyn Garden City, was the first home of the Trust.

The house was leased to the Trust to provide accommodation and studios for artists at a modest rent.

The first artists moved in at the end of 1957 and over the next 27 years nearly 150 were accommodated there.
Some, including  Michael Andrews, Ralph Brown, John Brunsdon, James Butler, Peter Collingwood, Hans Coper, Lol Coxhill, Elizabeth Fritsch and John W Mills have become internationally famous.

Many other distinguished people including - Henry Moore, Herbert Read, and Roland Penrose, supported the Trust by becoming Trustees or in other important ways.

In the early 1980s the Trust was financially unable to continue at Digswell House which was sold for refurbishment and was divided into a number of separate apartments.

1980s to present day 
Attimore Hall Barn, a restored 17th century listed building in the Panshangar area of Welwyn Garden City, had been leased in 1979 by the Trust as additional studio space. The Barn became the Trust's  base from 1984 until April 2006.
English Partnerships had by then taken control of the barn planning to convert it to housing. They worked with the Trust to design a new purpose-built studio building on the site of the former forge in Digswell, on which a 25-year lease was taken in April 2006.

In 1993 the Stevenage Borough Council leased the Fairlands Valley Farmhouse to the Trust  nearly doubling the available studio space.  In 2012, with the support of Letchworth Heritage Foundation, the Trust opened its third studio premises in Fenners Building, Openshaw Way, Letchworth.  The new building brings the number of artists supported by the Trust to 45 in 2015.

External links 
Henry Morris Biography
Digswell Arts Trust Website
Attimore Hall Barn

Charities based in Hertfordshire